The canton of Mèze is an administrative division of the Hérault department, southern France. Its borders were modified at the French canton reorganisation which came into effect in March 2015. Its seat is in Mèze.

Composition

 Adissan
 Aumes 
 Bouzigues
 Cabrières
 Cazouls-d'Hérault
 Fontès
 Lézignan-la-Cèbe
 Lieuran-Cabrières
 Loupian
 Mèze
 Montagnac
 Montbazin
 Nizas
 Péret
 Poussan
 Saint-Pons-de-Mauchiens
 Usclas-d'Hérault
 Villeveyrac

Councillors

Pictures of the canton

References

Meze